Hjälmaren ( or ), also spelled Jälmaren, is Sweden's fourth largest lake. It is situated in the Central Swedish lowland and drains through Eskilstunaån into the adjacent Lake Mälaren, which in turn drains into the Baltic Sea, west of Stockholm. It is connected by waterway with Stockholm by the 13 kilometres long Hjälmare kanal.

It is bounded by the provinces of Södermanland, Närke, and Västmanland.

Hjälmaren is 63 kilometres long, about 20 kilometres wide, and has an average depth of 6 metres, and a surface of 483 km². The town of Örebro is situated at the western end of the lake.
The lake itself is an iconic part of Sweden with music festivals taking place on the banks of the lake. Several notable bands played there, including The Smashing Pumpkins, Sonic Youth and Pearl Jam.

Between 1878 and 1887, a damming project lowered the surface level of Hjälmaren  to free up land for agriculture and to reduce the risk of flooding.

Rebel Engelbrekt Engelbrektsson was assassinated in 1436 at Engelbrektsholmen, an islet in Lake Hjälmaren.

See also
 Lakes of Sweden

References

Norrström basin
Lakes of Södermanland County
Lakes of Stockholm County